The 2023 Nigerian Senate elections in Imo State will be held on 25 February 2023, to elect the 3 federal Senators from Imo State, one from each of the state's three senatorial districts. The elections will coincide with the 2023 presidential election, as well as other elections to the Senate and elections to the House of Representatives; with state elections being held two weeks later. Primaries were held between 4 April and 9 June 2022.

Background
In the previous Senate elections, only one of the three incumbent senators were returned with Benjamin Uwajumogu (APC-North) winning re-election while and Samuel Anyanwu (PDP-East) and Hope Uzodinma (APC-West) retired to run for governor. In the East district, Onyewuchi Francis Ezenwa retained the seat for the PDP with 69% of the vote but the other two elections were more controversial as alleged election irregularities initially drew into question Uwajumogu's re-election in the North district while Rochas Okorocha (APC) was alleged to have forced a false election declaration in his favour. Overall, the inaugurations of Uwajumogu and Okorocha were delayed to later in June 2019. These results were a part of a showcase of the state's electoral competitiveness as the gubernatorial election was very close before having its results partially overturned in favour of APC nominee Uzodinma while the PDP won a majority in the House of Assembly. The AA, APC, and PDP split the House of Representatives seats while the state was easily won by PDP presidential nominee Atiku Abubakar.

After their belated inauguration, Okorocha and Uwajumogu were noted as two of the few APC senators from the South East. Uwajumogu died in December 2019 leading to a prolonged political and legal battle to succeed him that eventually resulted in Chukwuma Frank Ibezim (APC) becoming senator in 2021. By 2022, Okorocha unsuccessfully ran for president while Onyewuchi defected to the LP.

Overview

Summary

Imo East 

The Imo East Senatorial District covers the local government areas of Aboh Mbaise, Ahiazu Mbaise, Ezinihitte Mbaise, Ikeduru, Mbaitoli, Ngor Okpala, Owerri Municipal, and Owerri West. The district is centered around the city of Owerri and is sometimes referred to as the "Owerri Zone." The incumbent Ezenwa Francis Onyewuchi (LP) was re-elected with 68.8% of the vote in 2019 as a member of the PDP; he initially sought renomination in the PDP but lost the primary before defecting to win the LP nomination in June 2022.

Primary elections

All Progressives Congress 

Before the primary, pundits noted three major candidates: businessman Jerry Chukwueke, businessman Alex Mbata, and Ondo State First Lady Betty Anyanwu-Akeredolu. On 28 May, the primary was disrupted by thugs who forced Anyanwu-Akeredolu to flee the venue. After the escape, Anyanwu-Akeredolu told the party that "any result coming from this kangaroo election...should be rejected" and claimed that Governor Hope Uzodinma had hijacked the primary but when the primary process continued, she withdrew in protest in a letter saying "the circumstances that have shrouded events preceding this primary have proven to be far from [my] ideals." The primary was won by Mbata, who allegedly had the support of Uzodinma, with a 87% margin. In a post-primary statement, Mbata attempted to reach out to his former opponents but both Anyanwu-Akeredolu and Kemdi Opara rejected the primary.

People's Democratic Party 

Before the primary, pundits noted three major candidates: incumbent Onyewuchi, former House of Representatives member and former Secretary to the State Government Uche Onyeagocha, and businessman Basil Maduka. The indirect primary was held at The Mall Aladinma in Owerri and resulted in Onyeagocha defeating Onyewuchi by an 8% margin. Onyewuchi promptly left the PDP to obtain the LP senatorial nomination.

Campaign 
As the general election campaign began, observers noted controversies with Onyewuchi's sudden LP nomination and Mbata's fraud scandal while also focusing on the infighting within both the state APC and PDP. As the election neared in February, some pundits gave the advantage to Onyewuchi due to his incumbency and the coattail effect of LP presidential nominee Peter Obi. In the same piece, APGA nominee Chyma Anthony was dismissed as a major contender due to his party's dwindling popularity in the state while Onyegucha's campaign was notably hurt by continued PDP infighting and Mbata was benefited by growing APC popularity.

General election

Results

Imo North 

The Imo North Senatorial District covers the local government areas of Ehime Mbano, Ihitte/Uboma, Isiala Mbano, Obowo, Okigwe, and Onuimo. The district is centered around the city of Okigwe and is sometimes referred to as the "Okigwe Zone." In 2019, Benjamin Uwajumogu (APC) was re-elected to the seat. Uwajumogu died in December 2019, leading to a by-election in December 2020. Although the APC won the by-election, a dispute over the legitimate APC primary victor between Chukwuma Frank Ibezim and Ifeanyi Ararume delayed the inauguration; Ibezim won the court cases and took office late in April 2021. Ibezim sought re-election but lost renomination.

Primary elections

All Progressives Congress 

Before the primary, there were four major candidates: Ibezim, former MHR Patrick Ndubueze, former Governor Ikedi Ohakim, and former MHR Matthew Omegara; however, Ohakim and Omegara withdrew a few days before the primary. Ndubueze won the nomination.

People's Democratic Party 

Before the primary, pundits noted two major candidates: Ifeanyi Ararume Jr. (former commissioner and son of Senator Ifeanyi Ararume) and 2020 by-election nominee Emmanuel Okewulonu. On the primary date, candidates contested an indirect primary that ended with Okewulonu emerging as the nominee after results showed him defeating Ararume Jr. by a 37% margin.

Campaign
Campaign analysis in February noted the competitiveness of the election and the potential coattail effect of LP presidential nominee Peter Obi that could benefit LP nominee Ifeanyi Ararume Jr.

General election

Results

Imo West 

The Imo West Senatorial District covers the local government areas of Ideato North, Ideato South, Isu, Njaba, Nwangele, Nkwerre, Oguta, Ohaji/Egbema, Orlu, Orsu, Oru East, and Oru West. The district is centered around the city of Orlu and is sometimes referred to as the "Orlu Zone." Incumbent Rochas Okorocha (APC) was elected with 47.6% of the vote in 2019. In January 2022, Okorocha announced that he would run for president instead of seeking re-election; Okorocha came joint-last in the APC primary.

Primary elections

All Progressives Congress 

Before the primary, there were two major candidates: Goodluck Nanah Opiah (former House of Representatives member for Oguta/Ohaji/Egbema/Oru West) and Osita Izunaso (former Senator); however, Opiah dropped out just before the primary. On the primary date, Izunaso was nominated in a landslide over former MHR Greg Mbadiwe.

People's Democratic Party 

Before the primary, pundits noted three major candidates: Jerry Alagbaoso (House of Representatives member for Oru East/Orsu/Orlu), ThankGod Ezeani (former House of Representatives member for Ideato North/Ideato South), and Jones Onyereri (former House of Representatives member for Isu/Njaba/Nkwerre/Nwangele). In the primary, Onyereri defeated runner-up Ezeani by 27%. However, the primary was challenged up to the Supreme Court, which nullified the exercise in January 2023. The judgment, based on the primary taking place in Owerri instead of a location inside the district, also barred the PDP from fielding a nominee. In response, the PDP claimed it had informed INEC of the changed location and vowed to find a path to the ballot.

Campaign
Originally a competitive race between Izunaso (APC), Onyereri (PDP), and Charles Ugochukwu Ahize (LP); the court ruling removing Onyereri as legitimate nominee greatly impacted the election. Although some pundits began to write that Izunaso was now favoured to win the seat, other observers noted that some PDP figures and Orlu community leaders had thrown their support behind Ahize.

General election

Results

Notes

See also 
 2023 Nigerian Senate election
 2023 Nigerian elections

References 

Imo State senatorial elections
2023 Imo State elections
Imo State Senate elections